The seventh series of the ITV television series Benidorm, which is a sitcom set in an all-inclusive holiday resort (The Solana) in Benidorm, Spain, began broadcasting on 2 January 2015, consisting of seven episodes. The entire series was written by Derren Litten whereas both Sandy Johnson and David Sant were credited as individual directors throughout the series. This was the final series to feature the Garvey family, consisting of Mick (Steve Pemberton), Janice (Siobhan Finneran), Michael Garvey (Oliver Stokes) and Janice's mother Madge Barron (Sheila Reid), though Reid did briefly return in the eighth series. Furthermore, it was the first series not to feature Donald Stewart (Kenny Ireland), due to Ireland's diagnosis of cancer and subsequent death. Janine Duvitski reprised her role of Jacqueline Stewart, the character's wife, who was joined by newcomer Glynn (Alan David). Other returning cast members included Tiger (Danny Walters) and Clive Dyke (Perry Benson), who were joined by Terry Dyke (Charlotte Eaton); hairdressers Liam Conroy (Adam Gillen) and Kenneth Du Beke (Tony Maudsley); and Solana staff, consisting of barmen Mateo Castellanos (Jake Canuso) and Les/Lesley Conroy (Tim Healy), and manageress Joyce Temple-Savage (Sherrie Hewson). Elsie Kelly and Johnny Vegas, who are both original cast members of the programme, also reprised their roles during the seventh series.

Cast
 Jake Canuso as Mateo Castellanos
 Sherrie Hewson as Joyce Temple-Savage
 Tim Healy as Les/Lesley Conroy
 Janine Duvitski as Jacqueline Stewart
 Adam Gillen as Liam Conroy
 Tony Maudsley as Kenneth Du Beke
 Danny Walters as Tiger Dyke
 Perry Benson as Clive Dyke
 Alan David as Glynn
 Steve Pemberton as Mick Garvey (episodes 1–2)
 Siobhan Finneran as Janice Garvey (episodes 1–2)
 Sheila Reid as Madge Harvey (episodes 1–2)
 Oliver Stokes as Michael Garvey (episodes 1–2)
 Charlotte Eaton as Terry Dawson (episodes 1, 3–7)
 Elsie Kelly as Noreen Maltby (episodes 3–7)
 Johnny Vegas as Geoff "The Oracle" Maltby (episodes 3–7)
 Crissy Rock as Janey York (episodes 5–6)

Episodes

References

Notes

External links
 

Benidorm (TV series)
2015 British television seasons